The Communication Review is a peer-reviewed academic journal covering a great variety of aspects of media studies published by England-based publisher Routledge. Since 1999, the editors-in-chief have been Andrea L. Press (University of Virginia) and Bruce A. Williams (University of Virginia). The journal was established in 1995 with Robert Horwitz as founding editor. 

The journal bridges the fields of communications and media studies, including historical and feminist scholarship.

External links 
 

Publications established in 1995
Routledge academic journals
English-language journals
Quarterly journals
Communication journals